Yosra El Lozy (born August 8, 1985) is an Egyptian actress. She has received many awards from regional and international film festivals. She has won various awards for her acting in Qobolat Masrouqa (2008), Bel-Alwan el-Tabe'eya (2009), Heliopolis (2010) and Microphone (2011). She has also provided voice dubbing in Arabic for several films and television series.

Early life and family 
Yosra was born in 1985 to an Egyptian father and a Syrian mother. She majored in Political science at AUC and minoring in Theatre and Modern History. She has acted in many AUC Theatre productions such as “A Silly Goose”, “The Sultan’s Dilemma”, “Sulayman EL Halabi” and the “Reader”.

During her childhood, she enjoyed playing football, swimming, and ballet dancing.

Career 
Her professional acting debut was with director Youssef Chahine in Alexandria... New York where she played the role of young "Ginger" while she was only sixteen years old. Many critics argue that having a movie by the legendary Youssef Chahine on her resume is a responsibility and should have other respectable movies to follow.

With roles in “Stolen Kisses” and “Bel-Alwan el-Tabe'eya” alongside her young fellow actors, Yosra believes that her generation is filled with young cinematic potential that will rise full force to introduce a new generation of Egyptian film. She said that her generation is fed up with the same old plots and techniques, they don’t want the story of girl meets a boy with the soundtrack in the background.

In "Bel-Alwan el-Tabe'eya", Yosra played the role of a girl who suffers from an inner conflict and is indecisive on choosing between the guy she loves and her religious beliefs. Her character reflects a number of young women in our society who face daily tribulations thinking about the right path to take in their lives.

In 2009, she shared the experience of acting in independent movies and appeared in ‘Heliopolis’ by young director Ahmad Abdalla alongside Khaled Abol Naga, Hanan Motawie and Hany Adel. This year, the cast of ‘Heliopolis’ is gathered on set once more to bring us ‘Microphone’ a co-production between Mohamed Hefzy and Khaled Abo El Naga, which was awarded Best Arab Movie at Cairo International Film Festival and the Tanit d'or at the Carthage Film Festival.

In 2010, Yosra appeared in some smaller parts on TV and cinema, She has earned her some major parts on TV series like “Al-Gama'a” when she played Cherine, a patriotic TV presenter in which was the talk of the Arab Region, due to its great production quality, well-written plot and controversy. She also appeared in the award-winning film “Microphone” by young director Ahmad Abdalla as well as the romantic comedy “Ezaet Hob” alongside Menna Shalabi, that was released in 2011. Yosra is playing ‘Farida’, a hip energetic girl who is the total opposite of her conservative best friend Leila played by Menna Shalabi who tries to find love throughout the movie.

Personal life 
After five years of marriage, she gave birth to her first daughter Dalilah in 2014. Yosra rejected many roles after giving birth to her baby girl. She only consent to The X Factor program because she can escort Delilah with her on the bus (caravan) so she can breastfeed her as the crew was very understanding. In 2020, she had her second daughter, Nadia.

Political views 
Yosra describes herself as Nasserist.  She has participated in many demonstrations. One of them was because of Lebanese civil war as she demanded the expulsion of the Israeli ambassador from Egypt.

In 2011, she participated in the Egyptian revolution that toppled late Egyptian President Hosni Mubarak. She said in a street interview that there is a corrupt system and we should be all against it whether we were rich or poor.

Filmography

References

External links 
 
 
 
 Interview with Yosra El Lozy

1985 births
Living people
Egyptian television actresses
Egyptian film actresses
Actresses from Cairo
The American University in Cairo alumni
Egyptian people of Syrian descent
People of the Egyptian revolution of 2011